–

La prepago  is a Colombian telenovela produced by Sony Pictures Television for RCN Televisión, based on the popular book written by Carlos Duplat, Las memorias de Andrea.

Lilo de la Vega and Andrés Sandoval stars as the protagonists, while Julián Román, Alejandro Aguilar and Luis Eduardo Arango star as the antagonists.

Cast

Main cast 

Lilo de la Vega - Ana Lucia Barrera / Andrea
Andrés Sandoval - David
Julián Román - Wilson
Natalia Durán - Carolina
Juliana Robledo - Paola Cabal

Recurring cast 
Luis Eduardo Arango - Reinaldo “Don Rey”
Katherine Porto - Erika
Javier Delgiudice - Dr Valencia Guerra
Natalia Ramírez - Maria del Pilar
Alejandro Aguilar - Jimmy
Greeicy Rendón - Johana
Carmenza González - Ana de Barrera
Diego León Hoyos - Misael Barrera
Sofia Ortiz - Estefania
Didier Van Der Hove - Patrick Mackensie
Pedro Pallares - Moritz Levy
Daniel Rengifo - Faustino "Tino" Bejarano
Giancarlo Mendoza - Marco
Sergio Gonzalez - Samuel "Tio Sam" Bejarano
Victoria Hernández - Coronel Alzate
Ilja Rosendahl - Jean Louis
Alejandra Franco - La Mona
Jordana Issa - Laura
Nicolás Nocceti - Roberto Vasco

References

External links 

2013 telenovelas
2013 Colombian television series debuts
2013 Colombian television series endings
Colombian telenovelas
Spanish-language telenovelas
RCN Televisión telenovelas
Television shows set in Bogotá
Television shows set in Cartagena, Colombia
Sony Pictures Television telenovelas
Television shows remade overseas